Sericornis is a genus of small, mainly insectivorous birds, the scrubwrens in the family Acanthizidae. Despite the similarity in shape and habits, the true wrens (Troglodytidae) are a quite unrelated group of passerines.

The genus previously contained additional species but following the publication of a molecular phylogenetic study of the scrubwrens in 2018, several species were moved to the resurrected genus Aethomyias and the yellow-throated scrubwren was placed in its own monotypic genus Neosericornis.

The genus contains eight species:
 Large-billed scrubwren, Sericornis magnirostris
 Tropical scrubwren or Beccari's scrubwren, Sericornis beccarii - sometimes included in S. magnirostris
 Large scrubwren, Sericornis nouhuysi
 Spotted scrubwren, Sericornis maculatus - previously included in S. frontalis
 Tasmanian scrubwren or brown scrubwren, Sericornis humilis - previously included in S. frontalis
 Atherton scrubwren, Sericornis keri
 White-browed scrubwren, Sericornis frontalis
 Perplexing scrubwren, Sericornis virgatus

References

 Del Hoyo, J.; Elliot, A. & Christie D. (editors). (2006). Handbook of the Birds of the World. Volume 12: Picathartes to Tits and Chickadees. Lynx Edicions. 

 
Bird genera
Taxonomy articles created by Polbot